Jeffrey Harvey may refer to:

 Jeffrey A. Harvey (born 1955), professor of physics and string theorist at University of Chicago
 Jeffrey Harvey (biologist) (born 1957), biologist at the Netherlands Institute of Ecology

See also
Geoff Harvey (1935–2019), English-Australian musician